Simon Pusey (born October 1986) is an English journalist and television presenter at BBC World News. He also currently presents the headline bulletins on GB News.

Early life 

Pusey grew up in Winchester and attended Winchester College. He graduated from the University of Bristol before completing a postgraduate diploma in broadcast journalism at Cardiff University.

Journalism career 
Pusey joined the BBC in 2009 as a broadcast journalist on the news programme Wales Today. In 2010 Pusey was appointed the Mid Wales Correspondent, reporting on TV, Radio and Online.

In 2011 he joined Sky News working as a reporter for Channel 5 News. When Channel 5 News moved to ITN in 2012 Pusey became a presenter, anchoring the lunchtime and evening bulletins.

A year later he moved to Beijing, becoming China Central Television's main English speaking sports anchor.

In 2014 Pusey returned to London, joining Arise News as a news and sports Presenter.

By May 2019 Pusey was presenting for BBC World News.

Personal life 
Pusey lives in Soho London.

References

English television journalists
1986 births
Living people
Mass media people from Winchester
People educated at Winchester College
Alumni of Cardiff University